Morristown School District 75 is a school district in Maricopa County, Arizona.

References

External links
 

School districts in Maricopa County, Arizona